In the Middle Ages, Termagant or Tervagant was the name given to a god which European Christians believed Muslims worshipped.

The word is also used in modern English to mean a violent, overbearing, turbulent, brawling, quarrelsome woman; a virago, shrew, vixen. In the past, the word could be applied to any person or thing personified, not just a woman.

Origin of the concept
European literature from the Middle Ages often referred to Muslims as pagans, with sobriquets such as "the paynim foe". These depictions represent Muslims worshipping Muhammad as a god along with various deities in the form of idols (cult images), ranging from Apollyon to Lucifer, but their chief deity was typically named Termagant. In some writings, such as the eleventh-century The Song of Roland, this was combined to create an "unholy Trinity" of sorts composed of Muhammad, Apollyon, and Termagant.

The origin of the name Termagant is unknown, and does not seem to derive from any actual aspect of Muslim belief or practice, however wildly distorted. In the 19th century, Walter William Skeat speculated that the name was originally "Trivagante", meaning "thrice wandering", a reference to the moon, because of the Islamic use of crescent moon imagery. An Old English origin has also been suggested, from tiw mihtig ("very mighty"), referring to the Germanic god Tiw. Another possibility is that it derives from a confusion between Muslims and the Zoroastrian Magi of ancient Iran: thus tyr-magian, or "Magian god". Leo Spitzer argues that Tervagant, like several other names ending in -ant from the Matter of France (e.g. Baligant and Morgant), is an "occitanization" of a vulgar Latin present participle created by Old French poets for exotic effect. He proposes as its etymon terrificans ("terrifying"), appropriate for a god.

Termagant in literature
Whatever its origins, "Termagant" became established in the West as the name of the principal Muslim god, being regularly mentioned in chivalric romances and chansons de geste. The spelling of the name varies considerably (Tervigant, Tervagant, Tarvigant, etc.).

In Occitan literature, the name Muhammed was corrupted as "Bafomet", forming the basis for the legendary Baphomet, at different times an idol, a "sabbatic goat", and key link in conspiracy theories. The troubadour Austorc d'Aorlhac refers to Bafomet and Termagant (Tervagan) side by side in one sirventes, referring also to the latter's "companions".

In the 15th-century Middle English romance Syr Guy of Warwick, a Sultan swears an oath:

So help me, Mahoune, of might,
And Termagant, my god so bright.

In The Chanson de Roland, the Saracens, having lost the battle of Roncesvalles, desecrate their "pagan idols" (lines 2589–90):
E Tervagan tolent sun escarbuncle, / E Mahumet enz en un fosset butent,
(They strip the fire-red gem off Tervagant / And throw Mohammed down into a ditch...)

Tervagant is also a god/statue of the "king of Africa" in the Jean Bodel play in Old French after the end of the Third Crusade (c.1200), Le jeu de saint Nicolas.

In the Sowdone of Babylone, the sultan makes a vow to Termagaunte rather than Mahound (Muhammad) (lines 135–40): 
Of Babiloyne the riche Sowdon,
Moost myghty man he was of moolde;
He made a vowe to Termagaunte:
Whan Rome were distroied and hade myschaunce,
He woolde turne ayen erraunte
And distroye Charles, the Kinge of Fraunce.

In Geoffrey Chaucer's The Canterbury Tales, "Sir Thopas" (supposed to be told by Chaucer himself on the pilgrimage) is a parody of these chivalric romances. In the tale, a knight giant named "Sir Oliphaunt" is made to swear an oath by Termagant.

In Herman Melville's Mardi (Chapters 25, 26, 28), Samoa's wife Annatoo is described as a Termagant, and metaphorically referred to as Antonina (wife of Belisarius) to Samoa's Belisarius. Explaining why she had no need of the armaments on the ship, Melville writes "Her voice was a park of artillery; her talons a charge of bayonets." (Chapter 23.)

Ludovico Ariosto used the form Trivigante.

It has been claimed that Termagant became a stock character in medieval mystery plays but another source denies this. In the theatre, Termagant was usually depicted as a turbanned creature who wore a long, Eastern style gown. As a stage-villain, he would rant at and threaten the lesser villains who were his servants and worshipers.

"Termagant" as a ranting bully and a shrewish woman
 
As a result of the theatrical tradition, by Shakespeare's day the term had come to refer to a bullying person. Henry IV, part 1 contains a reference to "that hot termagant Scot". In Hamlet, the hero says of ham actors that "I would have such a fellow whipped for o'er-doing Termagant, it out-Herods Herod". Herod, like Termagant, was also a character from medieval drama who was famous for ranting. Beaumont and Fletcher's play, A King and No King, contains the line "This would make a saint swear like a soldier, and a soldier like Termagant."

Mainly because of Termagant's depiction in long gowns, and given that female roles were routinely played by male actors in Shakespearean times, English audiences got the mistaken notion that the character was female, or at least that he resembled a mannish woman. As a result, the name "termagant" came increasingly to be applied to a woman with a quarrelsome, scolding quality, a sense that it retains today. This was a well established usage by the late 17th century. Thomas Shadwell's play The Squire of Alsatia (1688) contains a character called Mrs Termagant who is out for revenge on one of the other characters, and is described as a "furious, malicious, and revengeful woman; perpetually plaguing him, and crossing him in all his designs; pursuing him continually with her malice, even to the attempting of his life." Arthur Murphy's play The Upholsterer (1758) also contains a female character called "Termagant". In Washington Irving's "Rip Van Winkle" (1819), Dame Van Winkle is described as a "termagant wife". "Virago", "fishwife" and "shrew"  are near synonyms for "termagant" in this sense. In season 2 of Westworld, Major Craddock calls Dolores a termagant. 

The term is still sometimes used of men. In 2008, the Australian politician Kim Beazley labelled opponent Tony Abbott a termagant.

See also

Mahound
Mohammedan
Orientalism

Notes

References
 Brewer's Dictionary of Phrase and Fable, "Termagant"
Mohja Kahf, 1999. Western Representations of the Muslim Woman: From Termagant to Odalisque (Austin: University of Texas Press)

External links

 Beazley's use: Paras 4-6

Medieval legends
Stock characters
Medieval Islamic world
Pejorative terms for women
Stereotypes of women
Islam in fiction
Fictional gods